The 1965 Melbourne Cup was a two-mile handicap horse race which took place on Tuesday, 2 November 1965.

The race won by Light Fingers, trained by Bart Cummings who won the first of what would end up being a record 12 Melbourne Cups. Ziema ran second also trained by Cummings making it the first of five times he trained the quinella.

Field 

This is a list of horses which ran in the 1965 Melbourne Cup.

References

1965
Melbourne Cup
Melbourne Cup
1960s in Melbourne